Cumberland County Technology Education Center (CCTEC) is a four-year vocational public high school located in Millville, New Jersey, United States (with a Vineland postal address) that serves students in ninth through twelfth grades from across Cumberland County, operating as part of the Cumberland County Vocational School District.

As of the 2021–22 school year, the school had an enrollment of 1,029 students and 86.0 classroom teachers (on an FTE basis), for a student–teacher ratio of 12.0:1. There were 213 students (20.7% of enrollment) eligible for free lunch and 63 (6.1% of students) eligible for reduced-cost lunch.

History
The school was formerly known as the Cumberland County Technical Education Center (same acronym) and its previous campus was in Deerfield Township (with a Bridgeton postal address).

The school, previously only a part-time school, relocated starting in the 2016-17 school year to a  campus in Millville constructed at a cost of $70 million and located next to Cumberland County College. The school initiated a new full-time high school program that included 240 students who will be part of the initial graduating class of 2020.

Administration
The school's principal is Gregory McGraw. His core administration team includes six assistant principals.

Admissions
County technical high schools in New Jersey may have selective admissions. In 2016 the school had 500 applicants, and testing and 7th and 8th grade grades were used to pick 241 of them.

Curriculum
In 2016 the school had 17 programs.

The school previously had electrician and plumbing/HVAC programs. The CCTEC board voted to end the programs in April 2016 as the number of students had dropped, and the plumbing HVAC/teacher left due to a layoff. Once it was confirmed that the school would become a full time school, this move effectively affected only part-time students already at the school; full-time students were to later have these programs available again, but they were not scheduled to be allowed to take them.

As of 2021, incoming students can be admitted into any of the following programs:

 Agricultural Sciences
 Automotive Technology
 Construction Trades
 Cosmetology
 Culinary Arts
 Engineering Technology
 Health Science and Medicine
 Information Technology
 Law Enforcement
 Studio Production and Broadcasting
 Welding

Athletics
Upon the full time high school program's establishment in 2016, the administrations of Millville Public Schools and Cumberland Regional High School stated that they would not admit CCTEC students into their schools' athletic teams. The CCTEC administration was negotiating with those entities to make a deal allowing athletic cooperation.

References

External links 
Cumberland County Technology Education Center

Data for Cumberland County Technology Education Center, National Center for Education Statistics

Millville, New Jersey
Vineland, New Jersey
Deerfield Township, New Jersey
Public high schools in Cumberland County, New Jersey
Vocational schools in New Jersey